is a Japanese anime television series by director Takuya Satō and illustrator Yoshitoshi ABe. The series aired in Japan from October 3 to December 19, 2018.

Plot
After spending 10 years in stasis, a robotics engineer awakens to a war-torn world and a fight for his life against machines that he and his father had a hand in creating.

Characters

 (Japanese); Adam Gibbs (English)
Derrida is an engineer and the son of Jaques Yvain, the inventor of the DZ AI technology that has brought forth a new civilization in the near future. He and his colleague Nathan discovered a flaw in the AI program his father created and reported to his boss, Andrei, who refused the recall. However it is revealed that Andrei wants to take advantage of the flaw and sets out to kill Derrida and his allies. Derrida miraculously escapes, but accidentally slips into a cryogenic chamber and sleeps for several years. When he awakens to a war-torn environment, he meets Vidaux and his daughter Mayuka and they agree to help him find a way to end the war. 

 (Japanese); Natalie Hoover (English)

 (Japanese); Bryn Apprill (English)

 (English)
Vidaux is a former police-inspector turned contractor who travels with his daughter Mayuka. He encounters Derrida and helps him end the war. 

 (English) 

 (English)

 (English)

 (Japanese); Seth Magill (English)

 (English) 

 (Japanese); Ben Bryant (English)

 (English)

 (Japanese)

 (English)

Production and release
Kadokawa originally announced the series at its Anime Expo booth on July 1, 2017, under the working title "Project D". The series was directed by Takuya Satō, written by Kenji Konuta, and animated by studio Geek Toys. Illustrator Yoshitoshi ABe provided the character designs for the series, while Koji Watanabe adapted the designs for animation. The series' music was composed by Maiko Iuchi and produced by Kadokawa. Sound for the series was directed by Yukio Nagasaki at Half HP Studio. The opening theme, "Paradox", was performed by Quadrangle, and the ending theme "Toki no Tsubasa" was performed by M.A.O and Himika Akeneya under their character names. The series consists of 12 episodes. Some characters' names allude to historical and literary figures, such as French philosopher Jacques Derrida and Chrétien de Troyes' novel Yvain, the Knight of the Lion.

The series premiered aired from October 3 to December 19, 2018 on Tokyo MX and other channels. The series is simulcasted by Crunchyroll, while Funimation produced an English dub. The first four episodes premiered on Crunchyroll on September 22, 2018. Crunchyroll and Hikari TV Channel broadcast the episodes four weeks ahead of its TV broadcast.

References

External links
  
 

Anime with original screenplays
Funimation
Geek Toys
Tokyo MX original programming